The Racquetball competition at the 2006 Central American and Caribbean Games was held in Santo Domingo, Dominican Republic rather than the main games site of Cartagena, Colombia.

Medal summary

Men's events

Women's events

Medals table

Men's Events

Singles event

Doubles event

Women's Events

Singles event

Doubles event

External links
Results on International Racquetball Federation website
 

2006 Central American and Caribbean Games
2006
2006 in racquetball
Racquetball in the Dominican Republic
Racquetball at multi-sport events